Soul Stirring (foaled 13 February 2014) is a Japanese Thoroughbred racehorse. As a two-year-old in 2016 she won the JRA Award for Best Two-Year-Old Filly after winning all three of her races including the Grade 1 Hanshin Juvenile Fillies. In the following year she took the Tulip Sho and ran third in the Oka Sho before taking the Yushun Himba and was again rated the best of her age and sex in Japan, winning the JRA Award for Best Three-Year-Old Filly. She remained in training for two more seasons but failed to win again.

Background
Soul Stirring is a brown mare with a white blaze and a white sock on her left hind leg bred in Hokkaido by the Yoshida family's Shadai Group. She was sent into training with Kazuo Fujisawa.

She was from the first crop of foals sired by Frankel, an undefeated racehorse whose other progeny have included Cracksman and Without Parole. Soul Stirring was the second foal of Stacelita, a multiple Group 1 winner in both Europe and the United States. As a descendant of the German mare Schonbrunn (foaled 1966) she was closely related to many other major winners including Sagace, Zagreb and Steinlen.

Racing career

2016: two-year-old season
Soul Stirring began her racing career by winning a race for newcomers over 1800 metres at Sapporo Racecourse on 31 July 2016. On 22 October the filly returned for the Ivy Stakes at Tokyo Racecourse and won from Persian Knight, a colt who went on to win the Mile Championship. The filly was then stepped up to Group 1 class for the Hanshin Juvenile Fillies over 1600 metres at Hanshin Racecourse in which she was ridden by Christophe Lemaire started the 1.8/1 favourite against eighteen opponents. Soul Stirring tracked the leaders before going to the front in the straight and won by one and a quarter lengths from the Artemis Stakes winner Lys Gracieux. Lemaire commented "I’m ecstatic. It's so special because I used to also ride her dam Stacelita... I was confident from the beginning and we were in a good position and she was relaxed. She easily hit the front at the stretch and with her big strides and stamina; I think she can go a little bit further in distance".

Soul Stirring won the JRA Award for Best Two-Year-Old Filly, taking 290 of the 291 votes.

2017: three-year-old season
Soul Stirring began her second season in the Tulip Sho at Hanshin on 4 March when she started odds-on favourite and won by two lengths from the 52/1 outsider Miss Panthere with Lys Gracieux in third. On 9 April, Soul Stirring was made 2/5 favourite for the Grade 1 Oka Sho over the same course and distance. Racing on soft ground she raced in mid division, but despite making progress in the straight she was beaten into third place behind Reine Minoru and Lys Gracieux. Lemaire explained "The track condition was against her and she kept changing leads. She wasn’t able to show her true form in this race".

In the Yushun Himba over 2400 metre at Tokyo Soul Stirring was partnered by Lemaire and started the 1.4/1 favourite in an 18-runner field which included Lys Gracieux, Reine Minoru, Admire Miyabi (Queen Cup), Mozu Katchan (Flora Stakes) and Deirdre. Soul Stirring raced just behind the leaders along the inside rail before switching to the right to make her challenge in the straight. She gained the advantage in the straight and won comfortably by one and three quarter lengths from Mozu Katchan. After the race Lemaire said "Soul Stirring certainly has inherited the power both from her sire (Frankel) and her dam. I was quite confident coming into this race. I wasn't sure yet about the distance as it was her first time (at 2,400m) so I wanted her in a good position which I did because she is quick out of the gate. She also has a good lasting speed so I was able to give her the go from early at the stretch and sustain our bid right up to the finish".

After a summer break Soul Stirring returned in autumn for three races in which she was matched against older hores and male opposition. In October she ran eighth behind Real Steel when favourite for the Mainichi Okan and then came home sixth to Kitasan Black in the autumn edition of the Tenno Sho. On her final run of the season Soul Stirring came home seventh of the seventeen runners behind Cheval Grand in the Japan Cup at Tokyo on 26 November.

In January 2018, Soul Stirring won the JRA Award for Best Three-Year-Old Filly, beating Mozu Katchan by 162 votes to 120.

2018 & 2019: four- and five-year-old seasons
Soul Stirring remained in training as a four-year-old in 2018. She began her campaign by running unplaced behind Miss Panthere in the Hanhin Himba Stakes over 1600 metres on 7 April and then came home seventh to Jour Polaire in the Victoria Mile over the same distance at Tokyo on 13 May. The Queen Stakes over 1800 metres at Sapporo on 29 July saw Soul Stirring earn her first prize money of the year as she finished third to Deirdre and Frontier Queen. She returned after the summer break for the Fuchu Himba at Tokyo on 13 October but ran poorly and finished tenth of the thirteen runners behind Deirdre.

On her first and only run as a five-year-old Soul Stirring ran unplaced behind Normcore in the Victoria Mile on 12 May.

Pedigree

References

2014 racehorse births
Racehorses bred in Japan
Racehorses trained in Japan
Thoroughbred family 16-c